Ceglo is a settlement south of Medana in the Municipality of Brda in the Littoral region of Slovenia, on the border with Italy.

References

External links
Ceglo on Geopedia

Populated places in the Municipality of Brda